Olena Zhyrko (born 16 February 1968) is a Ukrainian basketball player. She competed in the women's tournament at the 1992 Summer Olympics and the 1996 Summer Olympics. She played for Stal Dnipropetrovsk from 1984 to 1989, WBC Dynamo Kyiv from 1989 to 1993, for Skif Kyiv in 1994 and for MBK Ružomberok (1994-2000) in Slovakia, Gambrinus Brno (2001) in the Czech Republic and Istrobanka (2002-2003) in Slovakia.

References

External links
 

1968 births
Living people
Soviet women's basketball players
Ukrainian women's basketball players
Olympic basketball players of the Unified Team
Olympic basketball players of Ukraine
Basketball players at the 1992 Summer Olympics
Basketball players at the 1996 Summer Olympics
Olympic gold medalists for the Unified Team
Olympic medalists in basketball
Honoured Masters of Sport of the USSR
Sportspeople from Dnipro
Medalists at the 1992 Summer Olympics
Dynamo sports society athletes
Ukrainian expatriate basketball people in the Czech Republic
Ukrainian expatriate basketball people in Slovakia